CetraRuddy Architecture is a New York City-based architecture and interior design firm with projects in New York City, the United States, Europe, and the Middle East. It provides architectural and interior design services for residences, hotels, schools, and cultural institutions. The firm was founded in 1987 by John Cetra and Nancy J. Ruddy and is led by four principals and three associate principals with a staff of over 100 architects and interior designers.

Projects
CetraRuddy designed One Madison, a 50-story "sliver building" condominium tower on East 23rd Street at Madison Avenue, south of Madison Square Park. In 2014, the building received the Architizer A+ Jury Award for Residential High Rise, and since 2013, it has been part of the "Sky High & the Logic of Luxury" exhibition at the Skyscraper Museum in New York City.

The firm is also responsible for the adaptive reuse of residences of the Walker Tower, a former telephone switch building in Chelsea, Manhattan, and for the new Lincoln Square Synagogue building, which received an Honorable Mention for Religious Institution for Interior Design magazine's Best of Year Awards.

In 2018 they were featured in the New York Times for their new-construction apartment project ARO, on the site of the late Roseland Ballroom.

Awards
John Cetra and Nancy Ruddy were inducted into the Interior Design Hall of Fame.

References
Notes

Architecture firms based in New York City
Design companies established in 1987
1987 establishments in New York City